Monkey Dance is a 2004 documentary film by Julie Mallozzi, a filmmaker based in Boston. The film follows three Cambodian-American teens growing up in Lowell, Massachusetts as they face the challenges of urban America, learn from traditional culture and dance, and reflect on the sacrifices of their parents, survivors of the Khmer Rouge.

The Angkor Dance Troupe in Lowell, and other artists of traditional Cambodian folkloric dance, play centrally in the film as a unifying peaceful, historical, and creative activity for the youngsters and community.

Monkey Dance premiered on public television in May 2005 and has shown at numerous festivals, schools, museums, and youth organizations.

Filmmaker's viewpoint

Notes

Further reading
 Gewertz, Ken, "'Monkey Dance' illuminates refugees' lives: Documentary film focuses on three Cambodian teenagers", Harvard University Gazette, Harvard News Office, October 7. 2004 
 "Julie Mallozzi's 'Monkey Dance'", Mass Humanities, The Massachusetts Foundation for the Humanities, Fall 2001

External links

Monkey Dance film site
Angkor Dance Troupe, Lowell, Massachusetts

2004 films
Documentary films about children
American documentary films
Documentary films about immigration to the United States
Documentary films about the Cambodian genocide
Documentary films about Massachusetts
Lowell, Massachusetts
Cambodian-American culture
2000s English-language films
2000s American films